Caleb Smith Woodhull (February 26, 1792 – July 16, 1866) was the 70th Mayor of New York City from 1849 to 1851.

Biography
Smith Woodhull was born in Miller Place, New York on February 26, 1792.  He graduated from Yale University in 1811, studied law, and became an attorney in 1817.

Woodhull interrupted his studies to serve with the New York Militia in the War of 1812.  He remained active in the militia until resigning his commission in 1830.

A Whig, Woodhull was elected in 1836 to New York City's Common Council, and he became a member of the Board of Aldermen in 1839.  In 1843 he became President of the Board of Aldermen.

He was elected Mayor of New York in 1849 and served one term (the last one year term before mayoral terms were extended to two years, then, in 1905, to four years).

After leaving the mayor's office Woodhull retired to Miller Place, where he died on July 16, 1866.

References

External links
Caleb Smith Woodhull portrait and notes, New-York Historical Society

1792 births
1866 deaths
People from Miller Place, New York
People from Manhattan
Yale University alumni
People from New York (state) in the War of 1812
New York (state) lawyers
New York (state) Whigs
19th-century American politicians
Mayors of New York City
Woodhull family